Francis Gerard Luis Fairlie (1 November 1899 – 31 March 1983) was an English writer and scriptwriter on whom Sapper (H. C. McNeile) supposedly based the character of Bulldog Drummond. After Sapper's death in 1937, Fairlie continued the Bulldog Drummond book series.

Fairlie was born in Kensington, London, educated at Downside School, Somerset and the Royal Military College, Sandhurst. He was commissioned in December 1918 in the Scots Guards. He was both an Army boxing champion and a member of the Great Britain team in the bobsleigh at the 1924 Winter Olympics at Chamonix, France; his team finished fifth.

He married Joan Roskell in 1923 and became a journalist and screenwriter. He again served as an army officer in the Second World War. In addition to the Drummond series Fairlie wrote series books about Victor Caryll, Johnny Macall and Mr Malcolm. He died in East Lavington in West Sussex.

Bibliography

Non-series novels 
 The Man Who Laughed (1928)
 Scissors Cut Paper (1928)
 The Exquisite Lady (1929) – a.k.a. Yellow Munro
 Stone Blunts Scissors (1929)
 The Reaper (1929)
 The Muster of the Vultures (1930)
 Suspect (1930)
 The Man with Talent (1931)
 Unfair Lady (1931)
 Birds of Prey (1932)
 The Rope Which Hangs (1932)
 The Treasure Nets (1933)
 Copper at Sea (1934)
 That Man Returns (1934)
 The Pianist Shoots First (1938)
 They Found Each Other (1946)
 The Reluctant Cop: The Story and Cases of Detective Superintendent Albert Webb (late of Scotland Yard) (1958)

The Mr. Malcolm Series
 Shot in the Dark (1932)
 Men for Counters (1933)
 Mr. Malcolm Presents (1934)

The Bulldog Drummond Series
 Bulldog Drummond on Dartmoor (1938)
 Bulldog Drummond Attacks (1939)
 Captain Bulldog Drummond (1945)
 Bulldog Drummond Stands Fast (1947)
 Hands Off Bulldog Drummond! (1949)
 Calling Bulldog Drummond (1951)
 The Return of the Black Gang (1954)

The Johnny Macall Series
 Winner Take All (1953)
 No Sleep for Macall (1955)
 Deadline for Macall (1956)
 Double The Bluff (1959)
 Macall Gets Curious (1959)
 Please Kill My Cousin (1961)

Non fiction
 With Prejudice: Almost an Autobiography (1952)
 Flight Without Wings: The Biography of Hannes Schneider (1957)
 The Fred Emney story (1960)
 The Life of a Genius: Sir George Cayley, Pioneer of Modern Aviation (1965) (with Elizabeth Cayley)

Selected filmography
 The Lad (1935)
 The Ace of Spades (1935)
 The Big Noise (1936)
 Chick (1936)
 Calling Bulldog Drummond (1951)

External links

Dictionary of Literary Biography on Gerard Fairlie, Bookrags
Bibliography, Fantastic Fiction

References

1899 births
1983 deaths
People from Kensington
People educated at Downside School
Bobsledders at the 1924 Winter Olympics
English male bobsledders
English male boxers
English male journalists
English male screenwriters
English thriller writers
Olympic bobsledders of Great Britain
Scots Guards officers
20th-century English novelists
Graduates of the Royal Military College, Sandhurst
British male novelists
Boxers from Greater London
20th-century English male writers
20th-century English screenwriters